The Harvard Aesthetes was a group of poets attending Harvard University in a period roughly between 1912 and 1919. It includes:

Malcolm Cowley (1898–1989)
E. E. Cummings (1894–1962)
Arthur William Wilson - AKA Winslow Wilson. Pico Miran, Tex Wilson (1892-1974)
S. Foster Damon (1893–1971)
John Dos Passos (1896–1970)
Robert Hillyer (1895–1961)
John Brooks Wheelwright (1897–1940)

Sources
Virginia Spencer Carr, Dos Passos : a life, Garden City, N.Y. : Doubleday, 1984. 
Jonathan Freedman, Professions of taste : Henry James, British aestheticism and commodity culture, Stanford, Calif. : Stanford University Press, 1990. 

Aesthetes
American male poets